The 2018 European University Games was the fourth biannual European Universities Games (EUG). It was held in Coimbra, Portugal from 15 July to 28 July and was organised by the European University Sports Association (EUSA) and Portuguese University Sport Federation (FADU) with the cooperation of University of Coimbra, Municipality of Coimbra, and the Academic Association of Coimbra (AAC).

Sports

References

External links
Homepage
European Universities Games 2018 at eusa.eu

European Universities Games
European Universities Games
European Universities Games
Sport in Coimbra
European Universities Games